A Tribute to Bing Crosby is a 1994 studio album by Mel Tormé, recorded as a tribute to the singer Bing Crosby.

Track listing
 "This Is My Night to Dream"/"It Must Be True" (Gus Arnheim, Harry Barris, Johnny Burke)/(Gordon Clifford, James V. Monaco) – 3:23
 "Moonlight Becomes You" (Johnny Burke, Jimmy Van Heusen) – 3:47
 "I Can't Escape from You" (Leo Robin, Richard A. Whiting) – 3:46
 "With Every Breath I Take" (Ralph Rainger, Robin) – 3:47
 "A Man and His Dream" (Burke, Monaco) – 4:10
 "Without a Word of Warning" (Mack Gordon, Harry Revel) – 3:54
 "May I?" (Gordon, Revel) – 3:40
 "Please" (Rainger, Robin) – 3:45
 "Thanks" (Sam Coslow, Arthur Johnston) – 3:19
 "Don't Let That Moon Get Away" (Burke, Monaco) – 2:57
 "Soon" (Lorenz Hart, Richard Rodgers) – 4:13
 "It's Easy to Remember"/"Adios" (Rodgers, Hart)/(Enrico Madriguera, Eddie Woods) – 4:13
 "Love in Bloom" (Rainger, Robin) – 3:38
 "The Day You Came Along" (Coslow, Johnston) – 4:06
 "Pennies from Heaven" (Burke, Johnston) – 4:26
 "Learn to Croon" (Coslow, Johnston) – 4:05

Personnel 
 Mel Tormé – vocals
 Ken Peplowski – clarinet, tenor saxophone
 Randy Sandke – trumpet, flugelhorn
 Murray Adler – violin, concert Master
 Marilyn Baker – viola
 Paula Hochhalter – cello
 John Colianni – piano
 Howard Alden – guitar
 John Leitham – double bass
 Donny Osborne – drums
 Alan Broadbent – conductor

References

1994 albums
Mel Tormé albums
Albums produced by Carl Jefferson
Bing Crosby tribute albums
Concord Records albums